Beşiri is a town and seat of the Beşiri District in the Batman Province of Turkey. Its population is 11,120 (2021). It was originally a village of Diyarbakır Province, it later became a district of Siirt Province and finally in 1990 a district of Batman. The mayor is Mustafa Öztürt (BDP).

Notable residents 

 İsmail Özden

References

Populated places in Batman Province
Towns in Turkey
Beşiri District
Kurdish settlements in Batman Province